Greenwith Common is a hamlet in the parish of Perranarworthal, Cornwall, England.

References

Hamlets in Cornwall